Kopernia  is a village in the administrative district of Gmina Pińczów, within Pińczów County, Świętokrzyskie Voivodeship, in south-central Poland.

History

On 5 June 1257 r. at the meadows surrounding Kopernia Bolesław V the Chaste granted the Magdeburg rights for the city of Kraków. The aim of this edict was to rebuild the city after the Turko-Mongol invasion of Poland.

References

Kopernia